Graziana Saccocci (born 2 January 1960) is a former Italian Paralympic rower who competed in mixed coxed four events in international level events.

References

1960 births
Living people
Rowers from Milan
Paralympic rowers of Italy
Rowers at the 2008 Summer Paralympics
Medalists at the 2008 Summer Paralympics
Paralympic medalists in rowing
Paralympic gold medalists for Italy